Carlos Martí (22 February 1919 – 25 October 1999) was a Spanish water polo player. He competed in the men's tournament at the 1948 Summer Olympics.

References

1919 births
1999 deaths
Spanish male water polo players
Olympic water polo players of Spain
Water polo players at the 1948 Summer Olympics
Water polo players from Barcelona
20th-century Spanish people